The 2010 BCR Open Romania was a men's tennis tournament played on outdoor clay courts. It was the 18th edition of the event known that year as the BCR Open Romania, and was part of the ATP World Tour 250 series of the 2010 ATP World Tour. It was held at the Arenele BNR in Bucharest, Romania, from 20 September through 26 September 2010.

Entrants

Seeds

 1 Rankings are based on the rankings of September 13, 2010

Other entrants
The following players received wildcards into the singles main draw:
  Marius Copil
  Victor Crivoi
  Adrian Ungur

The following players received entry from the qualifying draw:
  Pablo Andújar
  Albert Ramos-Viñolas
  Guillaume Rufin
  Simone Vagnozzi

The following players received entry as a Lucky loser:
  Santiago Ventura

Finals

Singles

 Juan Ignacio Chela defeated  Pablo Andújar, 7–5, 6–1
It was Chela's 2nd title of the year and 6th of his career.

Doubles

 Juan Ignacio Chela /  Łukasz Kubot defeated  Marcel Granollers /  Santiago Ventura, 6–2, 5–7, [13–11]

External links

Official website

BCR Open Romania
Romanian Open
BCR Open Romania
BCR Open Romania